Christopher Nigel Page (1942–2022) was an English botanist who specialised in Ferns and Spermatophytes. He also worked on conifers, naming species of Afrocarpus, for example Afrocarpus dawei and Afrocarpus gracilior. After gaining his PhD at Newcastle University he had a post from 1968 to 1970 as a post-doctoral fellow at the University of Queensland, in Brisbane, working on Queensland pteridophytes, before returning to the UK to work at Oxford University for a year. In 1971 he joined the Royal Botanic Garden Edinburgh (RBGE). In 1976-77 he visited eastern Australia (Brisbane and Hobart) to work on pteridophytes (particularly Doodia, Cheilanthes and Adiantum) and also Japan, Taiwan, Hong Kong, The Philippines and New Zealand. He retired from the RBGE in 1996, moving to live in Cornwall. He joined Camborne School of Mines, University of Exeter, in 2004, teaching part-time on the Environmental Science and Technology degree in CSM, and also in Biosciences until 2008. Some of his research in Cornwall involved experiments in regreening former extractive minerals sites, which he presented in Parliament. He retired, as Senior Honorary Research Fellow, in June 2022. He was editor of the Transactions of the Royal Geological Society of Cornwall 1996–2015, then President from 1996 to 2020 (succeeded by Professor Frances Wall of Camborne School of Mines), and received the society's Bolitho Gold Medal in 2016.

Personal life

He had four children from two marriages. Zoe, Erica and Angus from his first marriage and Tamsin from his second.

Books
 The Ferns of Great Britain and Ireland, 1982. Cambridge University Press. 
 A Natural History of Britain's Ferns, 1988. New Naturalist 74. Collins.

References

1942 births
2022 deaths
20th-century British botanists
21st-century British botanists
British pteridologists
New Naturalist writers
Place of birth missing (living people)
Alumni of Durham University
Alumni of Newcastle University